Lynda Maureen Haverstock  ( Ham; born September 16, 1948) is the former leader of the Saskatchewan Liberal Party, was a member of the Legislative Assembly of Saskatchewan, and served as the 19th Lieutenant Governor of Saskatchewan from 2000 until July 2006. In 2007, she was named President/CEO of Tourism Saskatchewan.

Biography 
Born Lynda Maureen Ham and raised in Swift Current, Haverstock left high school after grade 10 to raise her infant daughter. As an adult, she returned to school to finish her education, and ultimately earned bachelor's and master's degrees in education, as well as a Ph.D. in psychology from the University of Saskatchewan. Haverstock rose to the forefront of the provincial Liberals in 1989 and was the first woman in Saskatchewan's history to lead a political party.  She brought the Liberals to realize a healthy increase in support, taking over 23 per cent of the vote in the 1991 provincial election.  However, their numbers were spread too thinly across the province to translate into seats.  Haverstock was the only Liberal to win a seat, in Saskatoon Greystone.

Under her leadership, the party grew significantly: in the 1995 provincial election, it  increased its caucus in the Legislative Assembly to eleven, becoming the Official Opposition. The Liberals captured one-third of the popular vote.

Faced with of a coalition of Regina Liberals and former Tories who had unsuccessfully challenged her leadership, Haverstock resigned as leader in 1995.  She spent the remainder of her legislative term as an independent member. In 1999, she retired from politics.

The Liberal Party continued to be divided by internal fighting and several members of the Legislative Assembly, including those who had opposed Haverstock, left in 1997 to join the Saskatchewan Party. The 1999 provincial election reduced the Liberals to three seats in the legislature. Since 2003, they have failed to elect any members.

After leaving politics, Haverstock worked briefly as a radio host before being appointed Lieutenant Governor of Saskatchewan in 2000. As the Queen's representative, she was instrumental in organizing the province's centennial celebrations in 2005. Haverstock's term in office was extended and she remained Lieutenant Governor until July 31, 2006. During her tenure, she granted patronage to over one-hundred community-based organisations.

Dr. Lynda Haverstock is a member of the Order of Canada and the Saskatchewan Order of Merit, and has honorary doctorate degrees from the University of Regina, Royal Roads University (Victoria), and Queen's University (Kingston). She is a recipient of the Distinguished Canadian Award and is named among the University of Saskatchewan's 100 Alumni of Influence.

In June 2007, she became President/CEO of Tourism Saskatchewan, an arms-length, industry-driven authority responsible, in part, for marketing Saskatchewan as a destination. She has been successful in raising the profile of the organization and broadening awareness of Saskatchewan's tourism sector. Under her direction, the province's first Summit on Tourism was held in September 2007; six President's Task Teams were formed to provide guidance on key challenges and issues; a Quality Assurance Program for the sector was introduced; and the first Tourism Advocacy Day at the provincial legislature was held in November 2011. Between 2006 and 2010, the province's tourism revenues rose from $1.44 billion to $1.68 billion, and increase of 13.5 per cent.

Dr. Haverstock sits on the Board of Directors for Shaw Communications.

She and her husband Harley Olsen (former CEO of the Office of the Provincial Capital Commission and former Deputy Minister of Municipal Affairs) have four children and nine grandchildren.

Her brother Dennis Ham sat as a Conservative in the Saskatchewan assembly.

Arms

References

External links 

1948 births
Living people
Saskatchewan Liberal Party MLAs
Independent MLAs in Saskatchewan
Lieutenant Governors of Saskatchewan
Members of the Saskatchewan Order of Merit
Members of the Order of Canada
People from Swift Current
Women MLAs in Saskatchewan
Female Canadian political party leaders
Saskatchewan political party leaders
Canadian women viceroys
Leaders of the Saskatchewan Liberal Party
20th-century Canadian politicians
21st-century Canadian politicians
20th-century Canadian women politicians
21st-century Canadian women politicians